Netechma albitermen is a species of moth of the family Tortricidae. It is found in Zamora-Chinchipe Province, Ecuador.

The wingspan is 17 mm. The ground colour of the forewings is white, slightly tinged with grey at the costa where it is dotted black. The forewings are suffused rust cream in the basal area. The markings are black-brown. The hindwings are cream with greyish strigulation (fine streaks).

Etymology
The species name refers to colouration of the forewings and is derived from Latin albus (meaning white).

References

Moths described in 2008
Netechma
Moths of South America
Taxa named by Józef Razowski